Charles Douglas, 3rd Duke of Queensberry, 2nd Duke of Dover,  (24 November 169822 October 1778) was a Scottish nobleman, extensive landowner, Privy Counsellor and Vice Admiral of Scotland.

Life
He was born in Queensberry House in Edinburgh on 24 November 1698.

The younger son of James Douglas, 2nd Duke of Queensberry, 1st Duke of Dover, and Mary Boyle, daughter of Charles Boyle, 3rd Viscount Dungarvan, on 17 June 1706 while still a child he was created in his own right Lord Douglas of Lockerbie, Dalveen and Thornhill, Viscount of Tiberris and Earl of Solway. In 1711 he succeeded his father as Duke of Queensberry and inherited Queensberry House, thanks to a grant of novodamus which excluded his mentally ill older brother James Douglas from the succession to the Dukedom, but left James the Marquessate of the same name. Upon his brother's death in 1715 he succeeded him as the 4th Marquess of Queensberry.

In 1728 Queensberry took up the cause of John Gay, who was friendly with his wife, after a licence for his opera Polly was refused. He quarrelled with George II and resigned his appointments in the same year. 

In 1746 the Duke of Queensberry invested in the British Linen Company as one of the original proprietors, hoping to aid the development of the Scottish economy through the manufacturing of linen to be sold to the American colonies and Caribbean plantations. In 1762, after the death of Archibald Campbell, 3rd Duke of Argyll, Queensberry became the Governor of the company until 1776. The period was one of turmoil and restructuring, as the directors of the company decided to stop manufacturing linen from factories owned in the Highlands and turn to financing independent manufacturers to continue their trade. It was an important moment in the history of Scottish finance and the future of the company.    

He was a founding governor of London's Foundling Hospital, created in 1739. He was appointed Keeper of the Great Seal of Scotland in 1761 and was Lord Justice General from 1763 until his death in 1778. Queensberry was one of many who had lost heavily from the failure of the Douglas Heron and Co Bank in 1776.  As his sons predeceased him, leaving him without heirs, his English titles, including the dukedom of Dover, became extinct, but the Queensberry title passed to his cousin, William Douglas.

Family

On 10 March 1720 he married Lady Catherine Hyde, a daughter of Henry Hyde, 4th Earl of Clarendon. They had two sons, who both predeceased him:
 Henry Douglas, Earl of Drumlanrig (1722–1754)
 Charles Douglas, Earl of Drumlanrig (1726–1756)

References

External links

1698 births
1778 deaths
Members of the Privy Council of Great Britain
103
Charles Douglas, 3rd Duke of Queensberry
Keepers of the Great Seal of Scotland
Lords Justice-General
Fellows of the Royal Society
Marquesses of Queensberry
Freemasons of the Premier Grand Lodge of England
Dukes of Dover
Peers of Scotland created by Queen Anne